Brookfield Conservation Park is a conservation park located in South Australia, about 130 km northeast of Adelaide.

History 
The area that became Brookfield Conservation Park was first settled in 1836 as a pastoral lease. Pioneer farming families kept sheep, which were confined in brush yards overnight and protected by shepherds living in simple slab huts. The area was later named Glen Leslie Station; during this period, the station grazed up to 2000 sheep and eucalyptus mallees on the land were razed for wood and charcoal. In 1971, using a $55,000 donation from the Forest Park Foundation of Peoria, the Chica­go Zoo­log­i­cal Soci­ety purchased the land as a con­ser­va­tion reserve for the south­ern-hairy nosed wom­bat (Lasiorhinus latifrons). The station was renamed Brookfield Zoo Wombat Reserve, after Brookfield Zoo in Chicago, Illinois. Six years later, the land was gifted to the Government of South Australia. Brook­field Con­ser­va­tion Park was formally pro­claimed on 6 July 1978, under the Nation­al Parks and Wildlife Act 1972. Beginning in 2008, the park is now managed in partnership with Conservation Volunteers Australia.

Wildlife 
Brookfield Conservation Park comprises three main habitat types: open mallee Eucalyptus; arid woodland including sugarwood (Myoporum platycarpum) and dryland tea-tree (Melaleuca lanceolata); and arid shrubland including bluebush (Maireana spp). The park is home to an important population of southern hairy-nosed wombats. Other mammal species include fat-tailed dunnarts, common dunnarts, red kangaroos, and western grey kangaroos. The park's birdlife includes two species of fairywren, the splendid fairywren and purple-backed fairywren. Other notable birds include emus, ground cuckoo-shrikes, Australian owlet-nightjars and malleefowl.

Gallery

References

External links
 Brookfield Conservation Park: National Parks and Wildlife Service South Australia

Conservation parks of South Australia
Protected areas established in 1978
1978 establishments in Australia